A Lady of Quality is a 1924 American silent historical drama film directed by Hobart Henley and starring Virginia Valli. Produced and distributed by Universal Pictures, it was based on the 1896 novel A Lady of Quality by Frances Hodgson Burnett. Previous adaptations include the film A Lady of Quality (1913).

Plot
As described in a film magazine, Clorinda Wildairs (Valli), brought up as a man as her father had no son, is headstrong, impulsive, unconventional, and fiery. Her contempt for men in any role other than that of sporting pals is dissipated by Sir John Oxen (Foxe), a young blood whose disdain breaks down her barrier and results in winning her affection and trust. Oxen turns out to be an unscrupulous and trifling cad who jilts the almost heart-broken Clorinda. Five years later, with her father dead, Clorinda has become the toast of London and engaged to Gerald Mertoun, Duke of Osmonde (Sills). Together with the forces of the Duke of Buckingham, the Duke has won the Queen's favor with a victory in Flanders. Oxen appears and threatens to compromise Clorinda, jeopardizing her happiness and future. When he makes unwanted advances towards Clorinda, she kills her former betrayer in a tempestuous rage. For days she lives in constant dread lest her deed be discovered. When her sister accidentally happens upon her secret, she connives to aid her in escaping the harsh penalties of the times. Clorinda has the room containing the murdered man's corpse sealed up, never to be disturbed, and flees from London. Her sister informs the Duke of Osmonde of his fiancee's hiding spot, and he joins her, promising that no harm will come to her, that his love will guard and protect her.

Cast

Preservation
With no prints of A Lady of Quality held by any film archives, it is a lost film.

References

External links

Still at silenthollywood.com

1924 films
American silent feature films
Films directed by Hobart Henley
Lost American films
Universal Pictures films
Films based on American novels
Films based on British novels
Films based on works by Frances Hodgson Burnett
American black-and-white films
Films set in London
1920s historical drama films
American historical drama films
Lost drama films
1924 lost films
1924 drama films
1920s American films
Silent American drama films